Edward Ross may refer to:

Edward Ross (cricketer) (1860-1937), New Zealand cricketer
Edward Alsworth Ross (1866–1951), American sociologist, eugenicist, and a major figure of early criminology
Edward Burns Ross (1881–1947), Scottish mathematician
Edward Denison Ross (1871–1940), English Orientalist and linguist
Edward Ross (rugby union), Scottish rugby union player
Edward Shearman Ross (1915–2016), American entomologist
Edward T. Ross (1886–1957), American sanitary engineer and inspector 
Edward T. Ross (engineer), pioneer automobile engineer for Cadillac and Crown
Gabrielle Ross, Lady Edward Manners (born 1975), British fashion designer

See also
 Ed Ross (1965–2016), American tintype photographer and lawyer